Radfordilaelaps is a genus of mites in the family Laelapidae.

Species
 Radfordilaelaps meridionalis Zumpt, 1949

References

Laelapidae